The South Santiam River is a tributary of the Santiam River, about  long, in western Oregon in the United States. It drains an area of the Cascade Range into the Willamette Valley east of Corvallis.

From this source, the confluence of Sevenmile and Squaw creeks, it flows briefly north, then generally west through the Western Cascades and Cascadia. It then flows a handful of miles before entering Foster Reservoir. At Foster Reservoir the Middle Santiam River joins the South Santiam. Downstream from the reservoir it flows west past Sweet Home, where it turns northwest, passing through the foothills into the Willamette Valley near Lebanon.

U.S. Route 20 follows the valley of the river from near its headwaters in the mountains to the Willamette Valley northwest of Lebanon.

Tributaries
Named tributaries from source to mouth are Sevenmile and Squaw creeks at the headwaters, then Three, Sheep, Elk, Soda Fork, Stewart, and Keith creeks. Then come Boulder, Little Boulder, Trout, Falls, Moose, Canyon, and Wolfe creeks. Further downstream are Dobbin, Soda, Cabin, Bucksnort, Mouse, and Deer creeks.

Below those are Shot Pouch Creek and the Middle Santiam River. Then come Ralston, Gadney, Wiley, Ames, Roaring, McDowell, Hamilton, and Onehorse creeks followed by Spring Branch. Entering the lower reaches of the river are Crabtree, Thomas, and Mill creeks, and the North Santiam River.

See also
 List of longest streams of Oregon
 List of rivers of Oregon
Willamette Riverkeeper

References

External links

 North Santiam Watershed Council
 South Santiam Watershed Council
 Willamette Riverkeeper

Rivers of Oregon
Rivers of Linn County, Oregon